Polyptychus andosa, or Coryndon's polyptychus, is a moth of the family Sphingidae. It is known from eastern and western Africa.

The length of the forewings is 26–29 mm for males and about 30 mm for females. The forewings and body of the female are cinnamon brown with indistinct markings.

The larvae feed on Morus and Parinare species.

Subspecies 
 Polyptychus andosa andosa (Forests from Sierra Leone to Nigeria)
 Polyptychus andosa tiro Kernbach, 1957 (Forests from the Congo to Uganda)
 Polyptychus andosa amaniensis Carcasson, 1968 (Tanzania)

References 

Polyptychus
Moths described in 1856
Moths of Africa
Insects of the Democratic Republic of the Congo
Insects of West Africa
Insects of Uganda
Fauna of the Central African Republic
Fauna of the Republic of the Congo
Fauna of Gabon
Insects of Tanzania